Swingle may refer to:

Swingle as a surname 
 Alice Haskins Swingle, an American government botanist
 Lyman Alexander Swingle, member of the Governing Body of Jehovah's Witnesses
Marion Stroud Swingle (1939–2015), American curator, author, and museum director.
 Paul Swingle (born 1966), former Major League Baseball pitcher
 Rich Swingle, American film actor, screenwriter and stage actor
 Ward Swingle (1927–2015), musician, singer, arranger, founder of the Swingle Singers
 Walter Tennyson Swingle (1871–1952), U.S. agricultural botanist

Other uses 
 A swingle (tool) is an alternate name for a scutch, an implement used to separate fibres by flogging.
Swingle, California, unincorporated community in Yolo County, California
The Swingles is a vocal octet founded by Ward Swingle.

See also 
 Swingletree